Vintage PKD is a collection of science fiction stories, novel excerpts and non-fiction by Philip K. Dick.  It was first published by Vintage Books in 2006.

Contents

Excerpts from novels
The Man in the High Castle
A Scanner Darkly
The Three Stigmata of Palmer Eldritch
Ubik
VALIS

Stories
"The Days of Perky Pat"
"I Hope I Shall Arrive Soon"
"A Little Something for Us Tempunauts"

Essay
"The Lucky Dog Pet Store" (Introduction to The Golden Man)

Letters
"The Zebra Papers"

References

2006 short story collections
Short story collections by Philip K. Dick